This is a list of fictional characters in the book The Complete Tales of Uncle Remus. Uncle Remus himself, and a couple of boys to whom he tells the tales, appear as framing devices and narrators in all the stories. The stories of Uncle Remus' visitor Daddy Jack often also include unnamed stock roles such as a daughter, a foolish bird, a man, a mother, a snake, a wise bird, and a witch.

In the collection The Tales From Daddy Jake, the Runaway, & Short Stories Told After Dark, Uncle Remus also uses unnamed stock roles including a miller, his wife, and a preacher (in "How a Witch Was Caught"); a man and his wife (in "The Foolish Woman"); and a slave and master (in "Death & the Negro Man").

In the collection The Tales From Uncle Remus & His Friends, Remus uses an unnamed king (in "The King That Talked Biggity"); two unnamed men, one who fools the other (in both "According to How the Drop Falls" and in "The Man & His Boots"); and an unnamed protagonist who acts foolishly but grows rich anyhow (in "A Fool for Luck").

In the collection Told By Uncle Remus, an unnamed man, wife, and magical dinner pot appear in the story "The Hard-Headed Woman".

In the collection Seven Tales of Uncle Remus, an unnamed woman squares off against a witch baby in "The Baby & the Punkins".

Characters

References
The Complete Tales of Uncle Remus by Joel Chandler Harris, copyright renewed 1983 by Richard Chase

(the book includes stories from the following original publications, all by Joel Chandler Harris:
 Uncle Remus: His Songs & His Sayings with illustrations by Arthur Burdette Frost, 1896
 Nights With Uncle Remus: Myths & Legends of the Old Plantation with illustrations by Frederick Stuart Church & William Holbrook Beard, 1883
 Daddy Jake, the Runaway: & Short Stories Told After Dark with illustrations by Edward Windsor Kemble, 1889
 Uncle Remus & His Friends: Old Plantation Stories, Songs, & Ballads with Sketches of Negro Character with illustrations by Arthur Burdette Frost, 1892
 Told by Uncle Remus: New Stories of the Old Plantation with illustrations by Arthur Burdette Frost & J. Condé and line drawings after half-tones by Frank Verbeck, 1905
 Uncle Remus & Brer Rabbit with illustrations by J. Condé, 1907
 Uncle Remus & the Little Boy with illustrations by J. Condé, 1910
 Uncle Remus Returns with illustrations by Arthur Burdette Frost & J. Condé, 1918
 Seven Tales of Uncle Remus, 1948)

Uncle Remus
Characters in American novels of the 19th century
Song of the South characters